Clarence Hassell Bullock (born 1939) is an American Old Testament scholar and former president of the Evangelical Theological Society. He was a professor at Wheaton College in Illinois from 1973 until his retirement in 2009.

Biography
Bullock received a B.A. in English from Samford University in Birmingham, Alabama in 1961, a B.D. from Columbia Theological Seminary in 1964, and a Ph.D. in Old Testament from the Jewish Institute of Religion at Hebrew Union College in 1970.

Bullock has served as both a pastor and a professor. He was ordained by the Presbytery of Birmingham in 1972 and served as the full-time pastor at First United Presbyterian Church of Trussville in Trussville, Alabama. He has also served as the part-time pastor at nine different churches in Illinois. As an educator, Bullock has taught at Bible and theology-related schools in seven different foreign countries, including Israel, Jamaica, Romania, and Japan. In the United States, he has also taught at Birmingham Extension Seminary and Lee College. From 1973 to 2009 he was a professor of Wheaton College, retiring in 2009 as the Franklin S. Dyrness Professor Emeritus of Biblical Studies. In 2007-08 he was president of the Evangelical Theological Society. 

Bullock has been involved, either as an editor or as an author, in fifteen publications, ranging from essays to books. He has also read eleven papers at professional societies. His latest work is "Psalms 1-72" (Baker Academic, 2015).

Published works

Books

Articles

Chapters

References

1939 births
Living people
American evangelicals
American male writers
American theologians
Evangelical theologians
Evangelical writers
Samford University alumni
Wheaton College (Illinois) faculty